Giornale di Brescia is an Italian regional newspaper based in Brescia, Italy. The paper has been in circulation since 1945.

History and profile
Giornale di Brescia was founded in 1945. The first issue appeared on 27 April 1945. The paper was official organ of the National Liberation Committee. Its headquarters is in Brescia. The paper was redesigned on 27 April 2015, its 70th anniversary.

In late September 2015 Nunzia Vallini was named as the director of the paper. She replaced Giacomo Scanzi in the post.

In 2012 Giornale di Brescia sold 18,419,601 copies.

References

External links
 Official website

1945 establishments in Italy
Daily newspapers published in Italy
Italian-language newspapers
Mass media in Brescia
Newspapers established in 1945